Clinton E. Arnold (born 1958) is a New Testament scholar who is the dean at Talbot School of Theology and 2011 president of the Evangelical Theological Society. Arnold's research interest is in the Pauline writings, the book of Acts, Graeco-Roman religions, the rise of Christianity in Asia Minor, and the theology of sanctification (including modern-day exorcism and spiritual warfare). He has authored six books, dozens of scholarly articles, and several entries in biblical dictionaries and study Bibles. In the past, he served as a regular columnist for Discipleship Journal, and is the general editor of the Zondervan Exegetical Commentary Series.

Education and family
Arnold earned his B.A.(1980) from Biola, his M.Div. (1983) from the related Talbot Theological Seminary, and his Ph.D. (1986) in New Testament exegesis at the University of Aberdeen. In 1991, he completed post-doctoral studies in the historical context of the epistle to the Colossians at Eberhard Karls Universität Tübingen. Arnold married Barbara (née Erickson) in 1981, and together they have three children.
Arnold was named the new dean of Talbot School of Theology in May 2012.

Works

Thesis

Books

Articles

References

Living people
1958 births
20th-century biblical scholars
21st-century Christian biblical scholars
New Testament scholars
Biola University alumni
Biola University faculty
Talbot School of Theology alumni
Alumni of the University of Aberdeen
American biblical scholars